The Douglas DC-6 is a piston-powered airliner and cargo aircraft built by the Douglas Aircraft Company from 1946 to 1958. Originally intended as a military transport near the end of World War II, Douglas reworked it after the war to compete with the Lockheed Constellation in the long-range commercial transport market. Douglas built over 700, and many still fly in cargo, military, and wildfire control roles.

The DC-6 was known as the C-118 Liftmaster in United States Air Force service and as the R6D in United States Navy service before 1962, after which all U.S. Navy variants were also designated as the C-118.

Design and development

The United States Army Air Forces commissioned the DC-6 project as the XC-112 in 1944. The Army Air Forces wanted a lengthened, pressurized version of the DC-4-based C-54 Skymaster transport with more powerful engines. By the time the prototype XC-112A flew on 15 February 1946, the war was over, the USAAF had rescinded its requirement, and the aircraft was converted to YC-112A, being sold in 1955.

Douglas Aircraft modified the design into a civil transport  longer than the DC-4. The civil DC-6 first flew on 29 June 1946, being retained by Douglas for testing. The first airline deliveries were to American Airlines and United Airlines on 24 November 1946. A series of inflight fires (including the fatal crash of United Airlines Flight 608) grounded the DC-6 fleet in 1947. The cause was found to be a fuel vent next to the cabin cooling turbine intake; all DC-6s were modified, and the fleet was flying again after four months on the ground.

Operational history

 

In April 1949, United, American, Delta, National, and Braniff were flying DC-6s in the United States. United flew them to Hawaii, Braniff flew them to Rio de Janeiro, and Panagra flew Miami-Buenos Aires; KLM, SAS, and Sabena flew DC-6s across the Atlantic. BCPA DC-6s flew Sydney to Vancouver, and Philippine flew Manila to London and Manila to San Francisco.

Pan Am used DC-6Bs to start transatlantic tourist-class flights in 1952. Several European airlines followed with transatlantic services. The DC-6B and C subtypes could often fly nonstop from the eastern US to Europe but needed to refuel in Goose Bay, Labrador, or Gander, Newfoundland, when flying westbound into prevailing westerly winds.

Douglas designed four variants of the DC-6: the basic DC-6, and the longer-fuselage higher-gross-weight, longer-range versions—the DC-6A with cargo doors forward and aft of the wing on the left side, with a cargo floor; the DC-6B for passenger work, with passenger doors only and a lighter floor; and the DC-6C convertible, with the two cargo doors and removable passenger seats.

The DC-6B, originally powered by Double Wasp engines with Hamilton Standard 43E60 constant-speed reversing propellers, was regarded as the ultimate piston-engine airliner from the standpoint of ruggedness, reliability, economical operation, and handling qualities.

Similar to the DC-6A, the military version was the USAF C-118 Liftmaster; the USN R6D version used the more powerful R-2800-CB-17 engines. These were later used on the commercial DC-6B to allow international flights. The R6D Navy version (in the late 1950s and early 1960s) had Curtiss Electric constant-speed reversing propellers.

The USAF and USN renewed their interest in the DC-6 during the Korean War and ordered 167 C-118/R6D aircraft, some of which later found their way to civil airlines. Harry Truman's first presidential aircraft was an Air Force short-fuselage DC-6 which was designated VC-118, and named The Independence. It is preserved in the National Museum of the United States Air Force at Dayton, Ohio.

Total production of the DC-6 series was 704, including military versions.

In the 1960s two DC-6s were used as transmitter platforms for educational television, based at Purdue University, in a program called the Midwest Program on Airborne Television Instruction.

Many older DC-6s were replaced in airline passenger service from the mid-1950s by the Douglas DC-7, but the simpler, more economical engines in the DC-6 have meant the type has outlived the DC-7, particularly for cargo operations. DC-6/7s surviving into the jet age were replaced in frontline intercontinental passenger service by the Boeing 707 and Douglas DC-8.

Basic prices of a new DC-6 in 1946–47 were around £210,000–£230,000 and had risen to £310,000 by 1951. By 1960, used prices were around £175,000 per aircraft. Prices for the DC-6A in 1957–58 were £460,000–£480,000. By 1960, used prices were around £296,000. Equivalent prices for the DC-6B in 1958 were around £500,000. Used prices in 1960 were around £227,000.

From 1977 to 1990, five yellow-painted Douglas DC-6Bs were used as water bombers in France by the Sécurité Civile. They were registered F-ZBAC, F-ZBAD, F-ZBAE, F-ZBAP, and F-ZBBU.

Variants

XC-112A
United States military designation of an improved version of the C-54 (DC-4); became the prototype DC-6. Eventually designated YC-112A, pressurized, P&W R-2800-83AM3 engines
DC-6
Initial production variant produced in two versions.
DC-6-1156 a 53- to 68-seat domestic variant with  R-2800-CA15 engines

Freighter variant; fuselage slightly lengthened from DC-6; fitted with cargo door; some retained cabin windows, while others had windows Precluded. Originally called "Liftmaster" as USAF models. The rear cargo door came standard with a built in  lift elevator and a Jeep. The Jeep was a public relations stunt and shortly after, was dropped. Slick Airways was the first airline to operate the freighter variant in April 1951.

All-passenger variant of DC-6A, without cargo door.
DC-6B-1198A a 60- to 89-seat domestic variant with  R-2800-CB16 engines

Swing tail freighter conversion to the DC-6B done by Sabena. Two converted, only one survives currently stored with Buffalo Airways
DC-6C
Convertible cargo/passenger variant.
VC-118
United States military designation for one DC-6 bought as a presidential transport with special 25-seat interior and 12 beds.
C-118A
Designation of DC-6As for the United States Air Force, 101 built.
VC-118A
C-118As converted as staff transports.
C-118B
R6D-1s redesignated.
VC-118B
R6D-1Zs redesignated.
R6D-1
United States Navy designation for the DC-6A, 65 built.
R6D-1Z
Four R6D-1s converted as staff transports.

Operators

Current operators 
Today, most DC-6s are inactive, stored, or preserved in museums. Several DC-6s fly in northern bush operations in Alaska, while several are based in Europe, and a few are still in operation for small carriers in South America.
 One DC-6A, G-APSA, is based in the UK and available for private charter. It was painted in British Eagle colours and appeared at many air displays. The aircraft was disassembled in 2018. It had been grounded at Coventry for some time due to wing spar issues, which proved beyond economic repair. The parts of the airframe were taken to the South Wales Aviation Museum in the spring of 2021, where it will be restored and reassembled to go on display. Another DC-6B (G-SIXC ex-Air Atlantique) was converted to a restaurant some years ago but was reported to have closed in 2017. It was also moved to St Athan with G-APSA, but was advertised for sale in August 2021.
 One DC-6B is in use by Red Bull in Salzburg, Austria.
 One DC-6B V5-NCG "Bateleur" was in use with Namibia Commercial Aviation. It was stored and derelict in Windhoek by Jan 2017.
 As of July 2016, Everts Air Cargo in Alaska operates eleven DC-6s and two C-46s, with several more in storage. Their sister company Everts Air Fuel operates three DC-6 and two C-46.

Former operators 
Many airlines and air forces from several countries included the DC-6 in their fleets at some point in time; these are further detailed in the list of Douglas DC-6 operators.
In the 1980s, several DC-6Bs were used as fire retardant tankers by Conair Aerial Firefighting of Abbotsford, Canada. Douglas sold the last aircraft to Everts Air Cargo in Fairbanks, AK, in the late 2000s.

Accidents and incidents

Surviving aircraft
, 147 DC-6s survived, of which 47 were airworthy; several were preserved in museums.

VC-118
On Display

 S/N 46-0505 Independence is on display in the Presidential Hangar at the National Museum of the United States Air Force, at Wright-Patterson Air Force Base in Dayton, Ohio. This aircraft served as President Harry S. Truman's personal aircraft until he left office in 1953. It later served as a VIP aircraft for other air force personnel before retiring to the museum in 1965.

VC-118A
On Display
 S/N 53-3240 is on display at the Pima Air and Space Museum in Tucson, Arizona. This aircraft served as President John F. Kennedy's Air Force One until 1962 when it was replaced as the primary presidential aircraft by VC-137C SAM 26000 and relegated to use as the backup presidential aircraft. It was the last propeller-driven aircraft to serve in the presidential fleet.

VC-118B
On Display
 C/N 43207, built in 1951, is on display at the National Naval Aviation Museum aboard Naval Air Station Pensacola in Pensacola, Florida

C-118A
On Display
 S/N 53-3255 is on display at Joint Base McGuire-Dix-Lakehurst, New Jersey. Elvis Presley returned to the United States in this aircraft after serving in the US Army in Germany. As of October 2009, it was being restored. Starting in 2010, this Liftmaster is showcased at the Museum of the United States Air Force at Wright-Patterson Air Force Base, 6 miles northeast of Dayton, Ohio.
 S/N 51-17651 is on display at the Jimmy Doolittle Air & Space Museum, located at Travis Air Force Base in Fairfield, California. This aircraft served first in the US Air Force and was later transferred to the US Navy as Bureau Number 131602.  
Flying
 C/N 45563 is currently flying with the Flying Bulls, owner Dietrich Mateschitz, out of Salzburg, Austria. This aircraft was once the private luxury transport of Yugoslav President Josip Broz Tito.
On Display
 C/N 45550 is displayed at Coventry Airport at Baginton, United Kingdom. Built in September 1958, this aircraft spent most of its life in Southeast Asia, and after serving with the CIA and Royal Air Lao, Air Atlantique Group bought it in 1987. Its last commercial flight was on 26 October 2004. It was featured in the 2006 James Bond film Casino Royale. No longer flying, it was converted into a static restaurant at Coventry airport, the "DC-6 Diner".
In Storage
 Two DC-6s that belonged to Aerosur, a defunct Colombian airline, are abandoned and parked in Alfonso Bonilla Aragón International Airport of Cali, Colombia.
On Display
 Everts Air Cargo retired the DC-6A N6174C "Good Grief" on 2 October 2016, after it made the final flight from Anchorage to Chena Hot Springs, concluding its 62-year flight career.
 A Republic of China Air Force DC-6B 18351 "Chung Mei" served as presidential aircraft from 1949 to December 1972 and army general aircraft until retired in December 1978, is parked at Republic of China Air Force Museum.

Specifications

See also

References

Notes

Bibliography

 Pearcy, Arthur. Douglas Propliners: DC-1–DC-7. Shrewsbury, UK: Airlife Publishing, 1995. .
 Roach, J and Eastwood A.B., Piston Engined Airliner Production List, 2007, The Aviation Hobby Shop
 United States Air Force Museum Guidebook. Wright-Patterson AFB, Ohio; Air Force Museum Foundation, 1975.
 Whittle, John A. The Douglas DC-6 and DC-7 Series. Tonbridge, Kent, UK: Air Britain (Historians) Ltd., 1971.
 Winchester, Jim, ed. "Douglas DC-6". Civil Aircraft (The Aviation Factfile). London: Grange Books plc, 2004. .
 Yenne, Bill. McDonnell Douglas: A Tale of Two Giants. Greenwich, Connecticut: Bison Books, 1985. .

External links

 Boeing: Historical Snapshot: DC-6/C-118A Liftmaster Transport
 DC-6 Images
 Airliners.net on the DC-6
 Oldprops.com Many Images

1940s United States airliners
1940s United States military transport aircraft
DC-06
Low-wing aircraft
Four-engined tractor aircraft
Articles containing video clips
Aircraft first flown in 1946
Four-engined piston aircraft